Municipal elections were held in the Canadian province of New Brunswick on May 12, 2008. Here is a summary of results in the major communities in the province.

Bathurst

Campbellton

Dieppe

Edmundston

Fredericton

Elected to city council

Grand Falls

Miramichi

Moncton

Elected to city council

Oromocto

Quispamsis

Riverview

Rothesay

Sackville

Saint John

Elected to city council

Shediac

Woodstock

References

Municipal elections in New Brunswick
2008 elections in Canada
2008 in New Brunswick